Marzığı (also, Marzygi and Marzygy) is a village in the Yevlakh Rayon (Yevlakh District) of Azerbaijan. The village forms part of the municipality of Hacıselli.

References

External links 

Populated places in Yevlakh District